Morgan Chapel and Graveyard – also known as Christ Episcopal Church-Bunker Hill – is a historic church in Bunker Hill, Berkeley County, West Virginia.  It is the oldest Episcopal church congregation in West Virginia.

In 1741 Morgan Morgan, one of West Virginia's earliest settlers, built the original log church on this site, about halfway between his cabin and the mill. Soon a cemetery was established.

The current Greek Revival building was constructed in 1851. Morgan Morgan I, II, III, and IV are all buried in the church cemetery, although the historic marker for Morgan Morgan is over a mile away near the town center and mill. Morgan Morgan's descendants later founded Morgantown, West Virginia.  Also buried in the graveyard is noted American portrait artist John Drinker (1760–1826), a Quaker who may have been a conductor on the Underground Railroad along with his wife Elizabeth and whose former house is also on the National Register of Historic Places.

During the American Civil War, both Union and Confederate troops encamped nearby and some in the chapel, as shown by recently uncovered graffiti. The diocese is currently seeking funds for further restoration. The closest local Episcopal parish is now Zion Episcopal Church in Charles Town, West Virginia, several miles eastward on the Winchester Pike, which celebrated its 200th anniversary in 2015. Until recently, that parish had used this chapel for at least one worship service each year (in September); other denominations and special events occasionally used it until the restoration commenced.

Morgan Chapel was listed on the National Register of Historic Places in 1984,

See also
 Morgan Morgan

References

External links

 

Cemeteries on the National Register of Historic Places in West Virginia
Churches in Berkeley County, West Virginia
Episcopal churches in West Virginia
Greek Revival church buildings in West Virginia
Morgan family of West Virginia
National Register of Historic Places in Berkeley County, West Virginia
Churches on the National Register of Historic Places in West Virginia
Churches completed in 1851
Colonial architecture in West Virginia
19th-century Episcopal church buildings
Anglican cemeteries in the United States